This bibliography of Dwight D. Eisenhower is a list of published works about Dwight D. Eisenhower, the 34th president of the United States.

General biographies 
 
 
 
 
 
 Krieg, Joann P. ed. (1987). Dwight D. Eisenhower, Soldier, President, Statesman. 24 essays by scholars.

Military career 
 Ambrose, Stephen E. (1970) The Supreme Commander: The War Years of Dwight D. Eisenhower excerpt and text search
 Ambrose, Stephen E. (1998). The Victors: Eisenhower and his Boys: The Men of World War II, New York : Simon & Schuster. 
 Eisenhower, David (1986). Eisenhower at War 1943–1945, New York : Random House. . A detailed study by his grandson.
 Eisenhower, John S. D. (2003). General Ike, Free Press, New York. 
 
 Irish, Kerry E. "Apt Pupil: Dwight Eisenhower and the 1930 Industrial Mobilization Plan", The Journal of Military History 70.1 (2006) 31–61 online in Project Muse.

Civilian career 
 Borhi, László. "Rollback, Liberation, Containment, or Inaction? U.S. Policy and Eastern Europe in the 1950s." Journal of Cold War Studies 1.3 (1999): 67-110. online

 Bowie, Robert R. and Immerman, Richard H. (1998). Waging Peace: How Eisenhower Shaped an Enduring Cold War Strategy, Oxford University Press. 
 Chernus, Ira (2008). Apocalypse Management: Eisenhower and the Discourse of National Insecurity, Stanford University Press.  
 Damms, Richard V. (2002). The Eisenhower Presidency, 1953–1961
 David Paul T., ed. (1954). Presidential Nominating Politics in 1952. 5 vols., Johns Hopkins Press. 
 Divine, Robert A. (1981). Eisenhower and the Cold War.
 Galambos, Louis. Eisenhower: Becoming the Leader of the Free World (Johns Hopkins University Press, 2020).

 Gellman, Irwin F. (2015). The President and the Apprentice: Eisenhower and Nixon, 1952–1961. New Haven, CT: Yale University Press.  
 Graff, Henry F., ed. The Presidents: A Reference History (3rd ed. 2002)

 Greenstein, Fred I. (1991). The Hidden-Hand Presidency: Eisenhower as Leader. Basic Books.  
 Harris, Douglas B. "Dwight Eisenhower and the New Deal: The Politics of Preemption", Presidential Studies Quarterly, Vol. 27, 1997.
 Harris, Seymour E. (1962). The Economics of the Political Parties, with Special Attention to Presidents Eisenhower and Kennedy. 
 Heller, Francis H.  "The Eisenhower White House." Presidential Studies Quarterly 23.3 (1993): 509-517 online.
 
 

 Kabaservice, Geoffrey. Rule and ruin: The downfall of moderation and the destruction of the Republican Party, from Eisenhower to the Tea Party (Oxford UP, 2012).
 Kahn, Michael A.  "Shattering the myth about President Eisenhower's Supreme Court appointments." Presidential Studies Quarterly 22.1 (1992): 47-56 online. 
 Kingseed, Cole Christian. Eisenhower and the Suez Crisis of 1956 (1995)
 King, James D.,  and James W. Riddlesperger Jr., "Presidential leadership of congressional civil rights voting: the cases of Eisenhower and Johnson." Policy Studies Journal 21.3 (1993): 544-555.
 Krieg, Joann P. ed. Dwight D. Eisenhower, Soldier, President, Statesman (1987). 24 essays by scholars.

 Launius, Roger D. "Eisenhower, Sputnik, and the Creation of NASA." Prologue-Quarterly of the National Archives 28.2 (1996): 127-143.

 Lasby,  Clarence G. Eisenhower's Heart Attack: How Ike Beat Heart Disease and Held on to the Presidency (1997)
 Mason, Robert. "War Hero in the White House: Dwight Eisenhower and the Politics of Peace, Prosperity, and Party." in Profiles in Power (Brill, 2020) pp. 112-128.

 Mayer, Michael S. (2009). The Eisenhower Years Facts on File. 
 Medhurst, Martin J. (1993). Dwight D. Eisenhower: Strategic Communicator. Westport, CT: Greenwood Press.  

 Newton, Jim. (2011) Eisenhower: The White House Years  
 Nichols, David A. Eisenhower 1956: The President's Year of Crisis--Suez and the Brink of War (2012).
 Nichols, David A. A matter of justice: Eisenhower and the beginning of the civil rights revolution (Simon and Schuster, 2007).

 Pach, Chester J., and Richardson, Elmo (1991). Presidency of Dwight D. Eisenhower. University Press of Kansas.  

 
 Rutland, Robert A. "President Eisenhower and His Press Secretary." Journalism Quarterly 34.4 (1957): 452-534. 

 Watry, David M. (2014). Diplomacy at the Brink: Eisenhower, Churchill and Eden in the Cold War. Baton Rouge, LA: Louisiana State University Press.

Historiography and interpretations by scholars 
 Burk, Robert. "Eisenhower Revisionism Revisited: Reflections on Eisenhower Scholarship", Historian, Spring 1988, Vol. 50, Issue 2, pp. 196–209
 

 McAuliffe, Mary S. "Eisenhower, the President", Journal of American History 68 (1981), pp. 625–32 
 McMahon, Robert J. "Eisenhower and Third World Nationalism: A Critique of the Revisionists," Political Science Quarterly (1986) 101#3 pp. 453–73 
 Pach, Chester J. ed. A Companion to Dwight D. Eisenhower (2017), new essays by experts; stress on historiography.

 Polsky, Andrew J. "Shifting Currents: Dwight Eisenhower and the Dynamic of Presidential Opportunity Structure," Presidential Studies Quarterly, March 2015.
 Rabe, Stephen G. "Eisenhower Revisionism: A Decade of Scholarship," Diplomatic History (1993) 17#1 pp 97–115.
 Schlesinger Jr., Arthur. "The Ike Age Revisited," Reviews in American History (1983) 11#1 pp. 1–11 
 Streeter, Stephen M. "Interpreting the 1954 U.S. Intervention In Guatemala: Realist, Revisionist, and Postrevisionist Perspectives," History Teacher (2000) 34#1 pp 61–74.

Primary sources 
 Boyle, Peter G., ed. (1990). The Churchill–Eisenhower Correspondence, 1953–1955. University of North Carolina Press.
 Boyle, Peter G., ed. (2005). The Eden–Eisenhower correspondence, 1955–1957. University of North Carolina Press. 
 Butcher, Harry C. (1946). My Three Years With Eisenhower The Personal Diary of Captain Harry C. Butcher, USNR, candid memoir by a top aide
 Eisenhower, Dwight D. (1948). Crusade in Europe, his war memoirs.
 
 Eisenhower, Dwight D. (1965). The White House Years: Waging Peace 1956–1961, Doubleday and Co.
 Eisenhower Papers 21-volume scholarly edition; complete for 1940–1961.
 
 
 Summersby, Kay (1948). Eisenhower was My Boss, New York: Prentice Hall; (1949) Dell paperback.

Eisenhower, Dwight D.
Eisenhower, Dwight D.
Political bibliographies
Bibliographies of people
Bibliographies of World War II